The Monastir Synagogue (Judeo-Spanish "Kal de los Monastirlis") is a historic synagogue of the once vibrant Jewish community in Thessaloniki.

History
The construction of the synagogue lasted from 1925 till 1927. The funding was due to Jews from Monastir in the Kingdom of Yugoslavia, chiefly by Ida Aroesti, in the memory of her late husband Isaac, and the families Camhi, Joseph Nahmias, Massot, Barouch, Halevi, Israel, Calderon, Faradji, and Meir. The synagogue was designed by architect Ernst Loewy (1878-1943) from the city Buchau of Austria-Hungary. He was based in  Karlsbad of Czechoslovakia, visiting Thessaloniki often as the engineer for the Austrian Company that built that railway line between Thessaloniki and Vienna. Loewy moved to Thessaloniki in 1938. The consecration by the locum tenens Chief Rabbi of Thessaloniki, Haim Raphael Habib, took place on the 27th Eloul, 5687 (September, 24th, 1927).

These families have fled Monastir during the Balkan Wars (1912-1913) and World War I (1914-1918) and established themselves in Thessaloniki creating their own kehila (community) within the greater Jewish Community.

The Monastir synagogue is the last traditional synagogue of Thessaloniki in the great tradition of Salonican synagogues bearing in their name the place of origin of the congregation members (Ashkenaz 1376, Majorka 1391, Provincia 1394, Italia Yashan 1423, Guerush Sefarad 1492, Kastilia 1492–3, Aragon 1492–3, Katalan Yashan 1492, Kalabria Yashan 1497, Sicilia Yashan 1497, Apulia 1502, Lisbon Yashan 1510. Portugal 1525, Evora 1535, Lisbon Hadash 1536, Otranto 1537, Ishmael 1537, Sicilia Hadash 1562, Italia Hadash 1582, Majorka Sheni 16th cent., Katalan Hadash 16th cent., Italia Sheni, 1606, Mograbis 17th cent.)

During World War II, the synagogue was saved by being requisitioned by the Red Cross. In June 1978, the structure of the building was severely damaged by an earthquake. It was restored by the Greek government and today is used primarily during the high holidays. In 2016 the historic restoration of the synagogue was completed by architect Elias Messinas and KARD Architects - Dimitris Raidis and Alexandros Kouloukouris. The restoration project was supported by the Federal Republic of Germany.

The synagogue is no longer in regular function. There is a new one shared with the Rabbinate and the offices of the Jewish Community of Thessaloniki at Tsimiski Street downtown. The Jewish museum is also near this new location.

See also
History of the Jews in Greece
 Μεσσίνας, Ηλίας. Οι Συναγωγές της Θεσσαλονίκης και της Βέροιας. Εκδόσεις Γαβριηλίδης, 1997. .
 Messinas, Elias. The Synagogues of Greece: A Study of Synagogues in Macedonia and Thrace: With Architectural Drawings of all Synagogues of Greece. Seattle: KDP, 2022.

References

Synagogues in Greece
Buildings and structures in Thessaloniki
Jews and Judaism in Thessaloniki
Greece–North Macedonia relations
Synagogues completed in 1927
1927 establishments in Greece